The 2009–10 MOL Liga season was the second season played, of this international ice hockey. Teams from Hungary and Romania participated. The total number of teams had gone down from the first season. Alba Volan's farm team left, and three Romanian teams left, while one Romanian team joined.

Teams
 Ferencvárosi TC
 Dunaújvárosi Acélbikák
 Vasas Budapest Stars
 Újpest TE
 Miskolci JJSE
 SC Miercurea Ciuc
 SCM Fenestala Brasov 68

Standings

Playoffs

References
Season on hockeyarchives.info

2009–10 in European ice hockey leagues
2009-10
2009–10 in Romanian ice hockey
2009–10 in Hungarian ice hockey